Kjell Cronqvist (20 December 1912 – 9 February 2008) was a Swedish footballer, football manager and bandy player. He was Djurgårdens IF manager in 1956–57.

References

Swedish bandy players
Swedish footballers
Swedish football managers
IK Brage players
Djurgårdens IF Fotboll players
Djurgårdens IF Fotboll managers
1912 births
2008 deaths
Association football goalkeepers
Footballers from Malmö